The striped mole skink (Eumeces indothalensis) is a species of skink endemic to Pakistan.

References

Eumeces
Reptiles described in 1997
Reptiles of Pakistan